The Peary expedition to Greenland of 1891–1892 was where Robert Edwin Peary, Sr. set out to determine if Greenland was an island, or was a peninsula of the North Pole.

History
Aboard was Josephine Diebitsch Peary, making her the first female on an arctic expedition.

An expedition to find Peary was organized by the Philadelphia Academy of Natural Sciences in 1892.

Crew
His crew consisted of the following:
Dr. Frederick Albert Cook, surgeon and ethnologist
John M. Verhoeff, mineralogist and meteorologist
Langdon Gibson, ornithologist
Matthew Alexander Henson, Eivind Astrup
Josephine Diebitsch Peary, who was Peary's wife
He was accompanied by Professors Benjamin Sharp and J. F. Holt, both zoologists from the academy.
William E. Hughes, ornithologist
Dr. Robert N. Keely, Jr., surgeon
Levi Walter Mengel, entomologist
Alexander C. Kenealy, correspondent of the New York Herald
Frazer Ashhurst and W. H. Burk
Relief expedition:
Angelo Heilprin, curator of the Philadelphia Academy of Natural Sciences, 
Henry G. Bryant
Jackson M. Mills, surgeon

References

History of Greenland
1891 in North America
1892 in North America
1891 in science
1892 in science
1891 in Greenland
1892 in Greenland
19th century in Greenland
Arctic expeditions
19th century in the Arctic